Thomas Carr College is a Roman Catholic co-educational day school in Tarneit,  Victoria, Australia. It is named after Thomas Joseph Carr, the second Roman Catholic Archbishop of Melbourne.

Craig Holmes is the current principal of the College, since January 2019.

School principals 
In 2006, the principal since the College's founding, Paul D'Astoli, was transferred and succeeded by Bruce Runnalls. Runnalls died in office in 2011 and was succeeded by Andrew Watson until December 2018, when he resigned. Craig Holmes is the current principal of the College, since January 2019.

Sport 
Thomas Carr College is a member of the Sports Association of Catholic Co-educational Secondary Schools (SACCSS) since 2019 and a former member of the Association of Co-educational School (ACS) sporting competition from 2003-2018.

ACS premierships 
Thomas Carr College won the following ACS premierships.

Combined:

 Beach Volleyball - 2018
 Touch Football (3) - 2008, 2010, 2011

Boys:
 Hockey (2) 2015, 2016
 Basketball (7) - 2005, 2006, 2007, 2010, 2011, 2017, 2019
 Cricket (3) - 2011, 2015, 2017
 Soccer - 2005
 Softball (6) - 2004, 2005, 2007, 2010, 2011, 2012
 Table Tennis - 2005
 Tennis - 2015

Girls:

 Football (3) - 2012, 2014, 2015
 Hockey - 2011
 Netball (3) - 2006, 2008, 2009
 Softball (3) - 2007, 2008, 2009

Houses  
There are four houses at Thomas Carr College. They are the Galway (yellow), the Moylough  (blue), Maynooth (red) and Westport (green). All are named after towns in Ireland and are significant places in Thomas Carr's life.

Controversy 
In 2002 it was reported that some Year 8 students were given money from male students to perform sexual acts.

In 2003, a Year 9 student committed suicide after being bullied at school camp. The resulting controversy led to widespread bullying awareness, and the state government introduced various reforms.

In 2005 the school established a "wireless bully button" system which alerts teachers by SMS when students push the button and records incidents via a network of 20 video cameras.

Notable alumni 
 Dante Exum – basketball player
 Manyiel Wugol – basketball player

See more
 List of schools in Victoria
 List of high schools in Victoria
 Victorian Certificate of Education

References

External links
Thomas Carr College website

Educational institutions established in 1997
Catholic secondary schools in Melbourne
Schools in Wyndham
1997 establishments in Australia